Parappanangadi Co-operative College was established in 1993 in Parappanangadi as a branch of the Taluk Co-operative Educational Society in support of students in Tirurangadi taluk and adjoining areas. Parappanangadi Co-operative College is being established as a separate institute under the newly formed Education Co-operative Society in the taluk functionality of the present in Tirurangadi taluk in 1996. In 1993, a college started functioning in a rented apartment in a five-room building with 100 students and ten subjects at the same time owning a university place and a wide range of buildings to assemble the color of the technology. The newly built Higher Secondary block is also becoming a milestone in the growth of the college. Co-operative college can facilitate the right color of education to students in Taluk and surrounding areas who are not entranced in regulatory institutions. Up to 3000 students, 40 plus teachers and 6 office staff are working in various courses. Education Institutions in Kerala started with the objective of providing education opportunities to the common children at the expense of private exploitation. The Co-Operative Education Society also works to help the unemployed and workforce unemployed. Co-operative colleges have increased their relevance to providing higher education facilities during the period of education.

External links
Official website

Universities and colleges in Malappuram district